The Anglican dioceses of Mombasa are the Anglican presence in and around Mombasa and south-east Kenya; they are part of the Anglican Church of Kenya. The remaining dioceses of the Church are in the areas of Maseno, of Mount Kenya, and of Nakuru.

Diocese of Mombasa

Mombasa is the oldest Kenyan diocese; it was erected from the Diocese of Eastern Equatorial Africa (which at that point covered all Uganda, Kenya and Tanganyika) in 1898. Following the addition of the territory around Kavirondo (approximately the territory of the 1961 Maseno diocese) in 1921 and the splitting of its area of northern Tanganyika in 1972, the Diocese of Mombasa comprised (only) all Kenya.

Bishops of Mombasa
1899–1916: William Peel (died in office)
1918–1936: Richard Heywood (later assistant bishop of Coventry 1937–1952)
1936–1953: Reginald Crabbe
1953–1964: Leonard Beecher (previously assistant bishop 1950–1953; also Archbishop of East Africa 1960–70; later Bishop of Nairobi 1964–1970)
1955–1961: Festo Olang', assistant bishop; suffragan for Western Kenya (Nyanza Province) from 1957; became first Bishop of Maseno
1955–1961: Obadiah Kariuki, assistant bishop; suffragan for Central and Eastern Kenya (Central Province) from 1957; became first Bishop of Fort Hall
1960–1961: Neville Langford-Smith, assistant bishop, suffragan (consecrated St Bartholomew's Day (24 August) 1960, All Saints' Cathedral, Nairobi, by Beecher); became first Bishop of Nakuru (Rift Valley Province)
1964–1981: Peter Mwang'ombe (resigned)
1981–?: Crispus Nzano, previously assistant bishop
1994–2015: Julius Kalu
?–2015: Lawrence Dena, assistant Bishop (former Provincial Secretary, 2006–2009)
2018–Present: Alphonse Baya Mwaro

Diocese of Nairobi

Founded from Mombasa diocese in 1964, the Nairobi diocese was the See of the Archbishop of Kenya from the independence of the Kenyan church in 1970 until the independent All Saints' Cathedral diocese took that role in 2002. The Diocese has been split three times: to erect Machakos diocese in 1985, the Diocese of Kajiado in 1993 and All Saints' Cathedral diocese in 2002. Until 2002, Nairobi diocese's cathedral was All Saints' Cathedral, Nairobi; since that cathedral became the seat of the new All Saints' Cathedral diocese, St Stephen's Cathedral, Nairobi, has served as the new cathedral.

Bishops of Nairobi, Archbishops of Kenya
1970–1980: Festo Olang'
1980–1994: Manasses Kuria
1997–2002: David Gitari

Bishops of Nairobi
1964–1970: Leonard Beecher, Archbishop of East Africa
2002–2010: Peter Njoka
2010–present: Joel Waweru

Diocese of Machakos

The Diocese of Machakos was erected from Nairobi diocese in 1985 and was itself split to create Kitui diocese in 1995, Garissa in 2007 and Makueni in 2013. Since 1992, the cathedral has been All Souls' Cathedral, Machakos.

Bishops of Machakos
1985–1995: Benjamin Nzimbi (afterwards first Bishop of Kitui, then Primate—Archbishop)
1995–2013: Joseph Kanuku
2013–present: Joseph Mutungi

Diocese of Taita–Taveta

On 1 July 1993, the Diocese of Taita–Taveta — named for Taita–Taveta County — was carved from the then very large Mombasa diocese. The diocese has not been split; it has a pro-cathedral at Voi, the county's largest town (though not its capital).

Bishops of Taita–Taveta
1993–2016: Samson Mwaluda
2016–present: Liverson Mng'onda (previously coadjutor bishop)

Diocese of Kajiado

Formed from Nairobi diocese in 1993, the Diocese of Kajiado now has a pro-cathedral at Emmanuel Pro-Cathedral, Kajiado.

Bishops of Kajiado
1997–2012: Jeremiah Taama
2012–present: Gadiel Lenini

Diocese of Kitui

The Diocese of Kitui was erected from Machakos diocese on 1 April 1995 and covers the former Kitui and Mwingi Districts — that is, the present Kitui County.

Bishops of Kitui
1995–2002: Benjamin Nzimbi (previously first Bishop of Machakos, afterwards Primate—Archbishop)
2002–present: Josephat Mule

All Saints' Cathedral Diocese

From 1964 until 2002, the Archbishop of Kenya had their See at All Saints' Cathedral, Nairobi as ex officio Bishop of Nairobi (diocesan bishop of the above Diocese of Nairobi). From 2000, the ACK Provincial Synod and Nairobi diocese entered formal discussions to create a new arrangement for the archbishop's See; a very small new diocese was carved from Nairobi diocese, around All Saints' Cathedral itself. The remaining Nairobi diocese now elects her own bishop, who is not the archbishop; while the new See — very unusually, not named for a place or area but for its own cathedral — of All Saints' Cathedral is held ex officio by the Primate and Archbishop of All Kenya. The diocese has two archdeaconries and twelve parishes. As the archbishop's diocese, the bishops in charge of Missionary Areas (i.e. proto-dioceses) are consecrated suffragans in this diocese (regardless of the diocese which their territory belongs to) until their own diocesan See's erection.

Bishops of All Saints' Cathedral, Primates and Archbishops of All Kenya
2002–2009: Benjamin Nzimbi
2008–2011: Rob Martin, suffragan for Marsabit Mission Area (became diocesan Bishop of Marsabit)
2009–2016: Eliud Wabukala
2016–present: Ole Sapit
David Mutisya, missionary Bishop of Garissa
Bill Atwood, suffragan (became diocesan bishop of the International Diocese of the Anglican Church in North America)
Cleti Ogeto, missionary Bishop of Lodwar

Diocese of Garissa

Garissa diocese was created from territory of Machakos diocese in 2007. Also called a missionary area, Mutisya is or was a suffragan of the archbishop, in All Saints' Cathedral diocese. The first and so far only Bishop of Garissa, since 2007, is David Mutisya.

Military Episcopate

In November 2009, the Anglican Chaplaincy to the Kenyan Armed Forces was raised into a diocese (ordinariate). It is headquartered at the Garrison Church of St Paul at Kahawa Barracks outside Nairobi.

Bishops for the Armed Forces
From 2007, Simiyu was the first and only Bishop suffragan to the Armed Forces (presumably suffragan to the Primate possibly to the Bishop of Nairobi).
2009–present: Peter Simiyu

Diocese of Makueni

The Diocese of Makueni was erected from Machakos diocese in 2013, and Joseph Kanuku, Bishop of Machakos, moved to the new See, becoming first Bishop of Makueni.

Bishops of Makueni
2013–2016: Joseph Kanuku (previously Bishop of Machakos)
2016–present: Francis Matui

Diocese of Malindi

Malindi diocese was erected from the Diocese of Mombasa in 2015. The first bishop, since 2015, is Lawrence Dena, previously assistant bishop of Mombasa, and former Provincial Secretary. The diocesan pro-cathedral is St Mary's Pro-Cathedral, Malindi.

References

 

Religion in the British Empire
Anglican dioceses established in the 19th century
Anglican dioceses established in the 20th century
Anglican dioceses established in the 21st century

1898 establishments in Kenya
1964 establishments in Kenya
1985 establishments in Kenya
1993 establishments in Kenya
1995 establishments in Kenya
2002 establishments in Kenya
2007 establishments in Kenya
2009 establishments in Kenya
2013 establishments in Kenya
2015 establishments in Kenya